In the men's singles final, David Nalbandian defeated Nikolay Davydenko with a score of 6–3, 6–4.

Seeds

Draw

Finals

Top half

Bottom half

External links
 Men's Singles draw
 Men's Qualifying draw

2006 Estoril Open